Even Closer is the second studio album by American singer-songwriter Goapele. It is essentially an expanded version of her self-released debut album, Closer (2001). Originally released in 2002, it was re-released in 2004.

Critical reception
Todd Kristel of AllMusic gave the album 3 stars out of 5, commenting that it treads "a thin line between appealingly eclectic and insufficiently cohesive". Mark Anthony Neal of PopMatters said: "Nothing on Goapele's Even Closer is likely to ever be an MTV buzzclip, but throughout her debut she exhibits striking vocals and solid song writing skills, suggesting that she will be a figure that will be heard from again and again, likely outlasting many of her neo-soul peers and some of the independent labels they record for."

Meanwhile, Cheryl Thompson of Exclaim! commented that "[the] only problem with the album is the one tone Goapele maintains throughout; each track on its own is conceivably thought-provoking, a testament to Goapele's writing abilities but as a commercial package it lacks a certain positive transgression into the realm of something new."

Track listing

Charts

References

External links
 

2002 albums
Goapele albums
Barely Breaking Even albums
Columbia Records albums